Ramnagar is a village in the southern state of Karnataka, India. It is situated in Shorapur Taluk of Yadgir.

Demographics

2011

References

Villages in Yadgir district